DNA polymerase mu is a polymerase enzyme found in eukaryotes. In humans, this protein is encoded by the POLM gene.

Function
Pol μ is a member of the X family of DNA polymerases.  It participates in resynthesis of damaged or missing nucleotides during the non-homologous end joining (NHEJ) pathway of DNA repair.  Pol μ interacts with Ku and DNA ligase IV, which also participate in NHEJ.  It is structurally and functionally related to pol λ, and, like pol λ, pol μ has a BRCT domain that is thought to mediate interactions with other DNA repair proteins.  Unlike pol λ, however, pol μ has the unique ability to add a base to a blunt end that is templated by the overhang on the opposite end of the double-strand break.  Pol μ is also closely related to terminal deoxynucleotidyl transferase (TdT), a specialized DNA polymerase that adds random nucleotides to DNA ends during V(D)J recombination, the process by which B-cell and T-cell receptor diversity is generated in the vertebrate immune system.  Like TdT, pol μ participates in V(D)J recombination, but only during light chain rearrangements.  This is distinct from pol λ, which is involved in heavy chain rearrangements.

POLM mutant mice
In polymerase mu mutant mice, hematopoietic cell development is defective in several peripheral and bone marrow cell populations with about a 40% decrease in bone marrow cell number that includes several hematopoietic lineages.  Expansion potential of hematopoietic progenitor cells is also reduced.  These characteristics correlate with reduced ability to repair double-strand breaks in hematopoietic tissue.  Whole body gamma irradiation of polymerase mu mutant mice indicates that polymerase mu also has a role in double-strand break repair in other tissues unrelated to hematopoietic tissue.  Thus polymerase mu has a significant role in maintaining genetic stability in hematopoietic and non-hematopoietic tissue.

References

External links 
 

DNA repair
DNA-binding proteins